Marshaar (also Romanized as Marshāʿar) is a village in Posht Tang Rural District, in the Central District of Sarpol-e Zahab County, Kermanshah Province, Iran. At the 2006 census, its population was 30, in 5 families.

References 

Populated places in Sarpol-e Zahab County